Cyphophanes is a genus of moths belonging to the subfamily Olethreutinae of the family Tortricidae.

Species
Cyphophanes dryocoma (Meyrick, 1916)
Cyphophanes dyscheranta Meyrick, 1937
Cyphophanes gracilivalva Horak, 2006
Cyphophanes khitchakutensis Muadsub, Sawitree & Nantasak Pinkaew, 2014

See also
List of Tortricidae genera

References

External links
tortricidae.com

Tortricidae genera
Taxa named by Edward Meyrick
Olethreutinae